Thornton's Bookshop (locally known as Thornton's) was the oldest university bookshop in Oxford, England. It was founded in 1835 by Joseph Thornton (1808–1891) in Magdalen Street.

From 1870, the bookshop was located at 11 Broad Street (opposite Balliol College), continued as a family business by five generations of the Thornton family and from 1983 by the Meeuws family, but closed at the end of 2002.  The business continues to sell via the Internet and mail order from  Faringdon, about 18 miles from Oxford.

The shop premises on Broad Street were frequently used for television adaptations like Brideshead Revisited, and the last Inspector Morse episode, The Remorseful Day.

The premises are now occupied by "The Shop of Secrets", a Harry Potter-themed shop.

See also
 Book trade in the United Kingdom

References

External links
 Thornton's website
 11 Broad Street

1835 establishments in England
Retail companies established in 1835
2002 disestablishments in England
Retail companies disestablished in 2002
Shops in Oxford
History of Oxford
Bookshops of England
Former shops in England